Maruzas was a 6th-century Iranian commander active during the reign of the Sasanian king (shah) Hormizd IV. He was defeated and killed by a Byzantine army led by Germanus at the battle of Martyrpolis.

Sources 
 

People of the Roman–Sasanian Wars
Generals of Hormizd IV
6th-century Iranian people